Heliozela rutilella is a moth of the family Heliozelidae. It was described by Francis Walker in 1864. It is found in New South Wales.

References

Moths described in 1897
Heliozelidae